Grigor is a masculine given name and a surname. Variants include Gregory, Gregor, Grigori, Grigory, and in Western Armenian as Krikor.

People with the given name
 Grigor III Pahlavuni (1093-1166), Armenian catholicos
 Grigor Artsruni (1845-1892), Armenian journalist
 Grigor Dimitrov (born 1991), Bulgarian tennis player
 Grigor Gurzadyan (born 1922), Armenian astronomer
 Grigor Koprov (born 1943), Macedonian musician
 Grigor Marzuantsi (18th century), Armenian book printer
 Grigor Meliksetyan (born 1986), Armenian footballer
 Grigor Nachovich (1845-1920), Bulgarian politician
 Grigor Parlichev (1830-1893), Bulgarian writer
 Grigor Paron-Ter (17th century), Armenian Patriarch of Jerusalem
 Grigor Tatevatsi (14th century), Armenian philosopher
 Grigor Taylor (born 1943), Australian actor
 Grigor Topalli (born 1992), Albanian footballer
 Grigor Vachkov (1932-1980), Bulgarian actor
 Grigor Vitez (1911-1966), Croatian writer
 Ronald Grigor Suny (born 1940), American historian

People with the surname
 George Grigor (1916-1992), Canadian ice hockey centre
 James Grigor (circa 1811-1848), English botanist
 Murray Grigor (born 1939), Scottish filmmaker

See also
 Gregory (given name) and variant Gregor
 Grigori (given name)
 Grigory
 Krikor, Western Armenian given name (equivalent to Easter Armenian Grigor)

Masculine given names
Bulgarian masculine given names